Gates of the Night is a 1946 French film that was directed by Marcel Carné. It starred Serge Reggiani and Yves Montand. The script was written by Carné's long-time collaborator Jacques Prévert. The film made its debut in the United States four years after its official release in France. It introduced the much-recorded popular song "Autumn Leaves" (French: Les feuilles mortes).

Plot
In the winter of 1945, immediately after the liberation, Jean Diego (Montand), a member of the French underground during World War II, meets Raymond, one of his comrades in arms who was believed to have succumbed in battle. On the night of that meeting, Jean encounters a homeless man named "Destiny" (Jean Vilar), whose predictions about him finding the woman of his life will not be too far from reality. Jean soon starts a liaison with Malou (Nathalie Nattier), a young woman who is married to a rich man. The next hours of his and Malou's lives are underscored by extreme, dramatic events; however, as the clochard (homeless person) predicted, they find their way out of the struggle and are able to move on, leaving behind wartime and its dangers. Malou is shot and killed by her husband.

Cast 
 Yves Montand as Jean Diego
 Pierre Brasseur as Georges
 Serge Reggiani as Guy
 Nathalie Nattier as Malou
 Saturnin Fabre as Mr. Sénéchal, the father of Malou and Guy
 Jean Vilar as "Destiny", the clochard
 Raymond Bussières as Raymond Lécuyer
 Sylvia Bataille as Claire Lécuyer

Reception
Les Portes de la nuit was released in the United States four years after it was first shown in France, where this psychological urban drama, especially due to its depiction of post-war Paris and close-to-dejected characters did not break the box office.  It has been said that this is not Yves Montand's best performance, probably because this was only his second film.  Overall, Les Portes de la nuit has narrative weaknesses regarding the plot; however, its settings are considered to be fascinating. Unlike the more celebrated and popular La Bataille du rail released that same year, which depicts France as united in noble resistance to German occupation, Les Portes de la nuit is noteworthy for its honest acknowledgement of French collaboration with the enemy, as embodied by Serge Reggiani's character Guy.

References

External links 

1946 films
1940s French-language films
Films directed by Marcel Carné
Films with screenplays by Jacques Prévert
Films produced by Raymond Borderie
French mystery films
1946 mystery films
French black-and-white films
Films scored by Joseph Kosma
Pathé films
1940s French films